Seaford Town is a settlement located in the parish of Westmoreland in Jamaica. It is located on the westernmost side of the island. It is commonly known as "German Town," due to the settlement of the area by German labourers in approximately 1835.

History 
It was founded by Charles Ellis, 1st Baron Seaford.

References 

Populated places in Westmoreland Parish